National Research University "Moscow Power Engineering Institute" (MPEI) is a public university based in Moscow, Russia. It offers training in the fields of Power Engineering, Electric Engineering, Radio Engineering, Electronics, Information Technologies and Management.

History
MPEI was founded in 1930. In 2011 it obtained the status of National Research University. Therefore, the new official name is National Research University Moscow Power Engineering Institute.

About MPEI
At MPEI there are 12 Institutes, 65 departments, 176 scientific laboratories, research construction bureau and test factory, unique educational TPP, educational Solar Power Plant, the biggest scientific technical library countrywide, stadium "Energia", palace of culture and a swimming pool.

Among the teaching staff there are 7 Academicians of RAS, 262 Science Doctors, 715 Philosophy Doctors.

The Study Campus is in Moscow Lefortovo district. The dormitories for students, health center, canteens, cafes are at the Campus at the Energeticheskaya, Lapina, 1st Sininchkina streets and Energeticheskiy passway. The newspaper Power Engineer, the Radio MPEI and the MPEI TV are all part of students’ cultural ambience.

MPEI has prepared more than 200,000 specialists in different branches of science and technics.

Student life at MPEI
Lectures at MPEI are read professionally. Standard student's scholarship is about 2,000 rubles. The study week consists of 6 working days. In the first years' vacation time students can participate in the construction camp work and in the senior years practice work at the enterprises is compulsory.

The Spartakiade of the faculties in 9 sports is held annually, as well as the "Miss 1st year" contest, "Miss MPEI", "KVN", faculty meetings and disco parties. The Radio MPEI project was founded in 2011 and since then has been constantly warming up the lunch break ambiance. The project was totally organized by students and is a subdivision of the Students' Trade Committee.

Teaching international students
Foreigners, starting from the 1950s, were entering MPEI without entrance exams. In order to raise their Russian knowledge to the satisfactory level, MPEI organized pre-university training courses. In these courses, foreigners are studying Russian language and specialized subjects in Russian.

Foreigners from 70 countries study at the university. Graduates who decided to work as MPEI teachers, are welcome to continue their education  at the Faculty of Qualification Raising or to fulfill the long-term 10-month science internship.

Cooperation
MPEI is an actual member of many international associations:
UNESCO, UNIDO, IAEA, International Association for Continuous Engineering Education, International Coordination Council of Educational Institutions Alumni, CIGRE Russian National Committee, Institute of Electrical and Electronics Engineers, Council on Superconductivity, World Wind Energy Association, European Association for International Education, Association of International Departments of Technical Universities of Central and Eastern Europe.

Following institutes are subdivisions of the University
 Institute of Power Machinery and Mechanics
 Institute of Thermal and Nuclear Power Engineering
 Institute of Energy Efficiency and Hydrogen Technologies
 Institute of Electrical Engineering
 Institute of Electrical Power Engineering
 Institute of Information Technologies and Computer Science
 Institute of Radio Engineering and Electronics
 Institute of Humanities and Applied Sciences
 Engineering-Economic Institute
 Institute of Remote and Additional Education
 Institute of Electronics and Nano Electronics 
 Institute of Hydropower and Renewable Energy
 Military Engineering Institute
More information could be find on the university website: www.mpei.ru

Notable students
 Alexander Akimov, chief supervisor of Reactor 4 during failed test
 Roman Avdeev, Russian businessman, investor, and philanthropist. Owner of Credit Bank of Moscow
 Alexei Bogomolov, radio engineer, Hero of Socialist Labour, Lenin Prize, USSR State Prize 
 Nikolay Brusentsov, chief designer of Setun, honoured researcher in Moscow State University
 Vladimir Holstinin, Russian musician, a co-founder of the band called Aria
 Ion Iliescu, 8th president of Romania
 Vsevolod Kukushkin, Russian journalist, writer and ice hockey administrator
 Yan Luguang, Chinese electrical engineer, created China's first tokamak device
 Victor Pelevin, Russian fiction writer
 Li Peng, Premier of China
Araceli Sánchez Urquijo, Niños de Rusia and the first woman to work as a civil engineer in Spain

Further reading
A book by Prof. Lev Davidovich Belkind, P.P.Elisarov, V.V. Meshkov and others about the first 50 years of activity of the Moscow Power Engineering Institute (Russian)

References

External links
Official site

 
Engineering universities and colleges in Russia
Science and technology in Russia
Universities in Moscow
Universities and institutes established in the Soviet Union
1930 establishments in the Soviet Union
Nuclear research institutes in Russia
National research universities in Russia
Educational institutions established in 1930